The 1952 Cal Poly San Dimas Broncos football team represented the Cal Poly Kellogg-Voorhis Unit—now known as California State Polytechnic University, Pomona—as an independent during the 1952 college football season. Led by Duane Whitehead in his fourth and final season as head coach, Cal Poly San Dimas compiled a record of 4–4. The team was outscored by its opponents 224 to 159 for the season.

Whitehead served as the Broncos' head coach from 1948 to 1950, but had been replaced by Don Rees for the 1951 season. He finished his tenure at Cal Poly San Dimas with an overall record of 13–22–1, for a .375 winning percentage.

Schedule

Notes

References

Cal Poly San Dimas
Cal Poly Pomona Broncos football seasons
Cal Poly Pomona Broncos football